The Federal Ministry of Aviation is one of the Federal Ministries of Nigeria that regulates air travel and aviation services in Nigeria.
The current Minister of Aviation is Hadi Sirika. He was appointed on 21 August 2019 by President Muhammadu Buhari.

Organisation 
The ministry is responsible for formulation and management of the government's aviation policies in Nigeria.

It is directly responsible for overseeing air transportation, airport development and maintenance, provision of aviation infrastructural services and other needs.
The ministry is headed by a Minister appointed by the President, assisted by a Permanent Secretary, who is a career civil servant.
The Ministry is responsible for parastatals such as the Nigerian College of Aviation Technology. The ministry has its headquarters in Abuja. Previously the head office was in Lagos.

Departments

Previously the ministry's Civil Aviation Department investigated aircraft accidents. In 1989 the Federal Civil Aviation Authority (FCAA) opened, and the Civil Aviation Department became the FCAA Department of Safety Services. During the same year the Accident Investigation Bureau (AIB), subordinate to the Ministry of Aviation, was established, and the FCAA no longer had accident investigation responsibilities. The name of the bureau was later changed to the Accident Investigation and Prevention Bureau. As part of the Civil Aviation Act of 2006, the AIB became an autonomous agency, the Accident Investigation Bureau.

References

External links

 Nigerian Federal Ministry of Aviation (Archive)

Federal Ministries of Nigeria
Nigeria
Nigeria
Aviation organizations based in Nigeria